Panna Udvardy (born 28 September 1998) is a Hungarian tennis player. She has career-high WTA rankings of 76 in singles, achieved on 12 September 2022, and 65 in doubles, set on 24 October 2022.

Professional career

2017: WTA Tour debut
Udvardy made her WTA Tour main-draw debut at the 2017 Hungarian Ladies Open in the doubles tournament, partnering Anna Blinkova.

2021: First WTA 125 final, top 100 debut
She reached her first final on the WTA Challenger Tour at the 2021 Montevideo Open, losing to Diane Parry in straight sets. She made her top 100 debut at World No. 96 on 29 November 2021.

2022: Major debut & first win, WTA 125 singles & two doubles finals
She reached her maiden doubles final at the WTA 500 Sydney Tennis Classic, partnering Vivian Heisen.

She made her Grand Slam debut at the 2022 Australian Open.

She recorded her first major match win at the Wimbledon Championships on her debut at this major defeating Tamara Zidanšek.

Partnering Amina Anshba, she ended runner-up at the Palermo Open, her second doubles final on the WTA Tour. They were defeated by the defending champion Kimberley Zimmermann, who played alongside Anna Bondar.

2023: Third doubles runner-up

Performance timeline

Only main-draw results in WTA Tour, Grand Slam tournaments, Fed Cup/Billie Jean King Cup and Olympic Games are included in win–loss records.

Singles
Current after the 2023 Merida Open.

Doubles

WTA career finals

Doubles: 3 (3 runner-ups)

WTA Challenger finals

Singles: 3 (1 title, 2 runner-ups)

Doubles: 3 (1 title, 2 runner-ups)

ITF Circuit finals

Singles: 17 (11 titles, 6 runner–ups)

Doubles: 12 (9 titles, 3 runner–ups)

ITF Junior Circuit finals

Singles: 6 (2–4)

Doubles: 16 (11–5)

Head-to-head record

Record against top 10 players
Udvardy's record against players who have been ranked in the top 10. Active players are in boldface:

Notes

References

External links
 
 

1998 births
Living people
Hungarian female tennis players
People from Kaposvár
Sportspeople from Somogy County
21st-century Hungarian women